Kafka is a Czech surname, which is close to the word "kavka" meaning jackdaw, or occasionally a given name from a Yiddish diminutive for Ya'akov. Notable people with the surname include:

 Alexandre Kafka (1917–2007), Czech-Brazilian international economist
 Bohumil Kafka (1878–1942), Czech sculptor and pedagogue
 Bruno Kafka (1881–1931), Czech politician and academic
 Franz Kafka (1883–1924), Czech German-language writer
 Gustav Kafka (1883–1953), Austrian philosopher and psychologist
 Helene Kafka (1894–1943), Bohemian-Austrian nun, surgical nurse
 Jakub Kafka (born 1976), Czech footballer
 Maria Restituta Kafka (1894-1943), Czech-Austrian Catholic religious sister and martyr
 Martin Kafka (born 1947), American psychiatrist
 Mike Kafka (born 1987), American football player
 Ottla Kafka (1892–1943), sister of Franz Kafka
 Styliani ("Stella") Kafka (born 1974), Greek-American astronomer, former executive director of the American Association of Variable Star Observers, and current executive director of the American Meteorological Society.
 Vladimír Kafka (1931–1970), Czech translator

See also
Kavka, alternative spelling of the surname

References 

Czech-language surnames
Surnames from nicknames
Surnames from given names